Barbardiya Municipality is a municipality located in Bardiya District in Lumbini Province of Nepal.

On 10 March 2017 Government of Nepal announced 744 local level units as per the new constitution of Nepal 2015. On the same date this municipality also came into existence, merging the then VDCs of Baniyabhar, Padanaha, Magaragadi and Dhadhawar. The municipality is situated in the center of the district on the latitudes of 28 degree 26 minute to 28 degree 36 minute north and longitude 81 degree 30 minute to 81 degree 50 minute east. The municipality is surrounded by Bansgadhi municipality in the east, Madhuban municipality in the west, Thakurbaba municipality and Bardiya National Park in the north and Gulariya municipality in the south.

Demographics
At the time of the 2011 Nepal census, Barbadiya Municipality had a population of 68,031. Of these, 73.1% spoke Tharu, 24.7% Nepali, 1.1% Magar, 0.4% Raji, 0.1% Maithili, 0.1% Urdu, 0.1% Hindi and 0.5% other languages as their first language.

In terms of ethnicity/caste, 73.8% were Tharu, 8.3% Chhetri, 5.8% Hill Brahmin, 2.9% Kami, 2.7% Magar, 1.7% Damai/Dholi, 1.1% Sanyasi/Dasnami, 1.1% Thakuri, 0.8% Sarki and 1.8% others.

In terms of religion, 95.6% were Hindu, 3.1% Christian, 1.0% Buddhist and 0.2% Muslim.

References

Municipalities in Lumbini Province
Nepal municipalities established in 2017
Populated places in Bardiya District
Municipalities in Bardiya District